In 2020, the following events occurred in science fiction.

Deaths 
Mike Resnick, author
Christopher Tolkien, editor and author
Carlos Ruiz Zafón, author
Terry Goodkind, author
Richard A. Lupoff, author
Ben Bova, author
Dean Ing, author
Phyllis Eisenstein, author
James E. Gunn, author and editor

Literary releases

Novels 

Providence, Max Barry
Chosen Spirits, Samit Basu
Tender Is the Flesh, Agustina Bazterrica
Machine, Elizabeth Bear
Ghost Species, James Bradley
Failed State, Christopher Brown
The Book of Koli, M. R. Carey
Bridge 108, Anne Charnock
Attack Surface, Cory Doctorow
City Under the Stars, Gardner Dozois & Michael Swanwick
Unconquerable Sun, Kate Elliott
Agency, William Gibson
Anthropocene Rag, Alex Irvine
The Vanished Birds, Simon Jimenez
The Space Between Worlds, Micaiah Johnson
The Relentless Moon, Mary Robinette Kowal
The Eleventh Gate, Nancy Kress
The Arrest, Jonathan Lethem
War of the Maps, Paul J. McAuley
Pacific Storm, Linda Nagata
Driving the Deep, Suzanne Palmer
The Evidence, Christopher Priest
Bone Silence, Alastair Reynolds
The Ministry for the Future, Kim Stanley Robinson
The Last Emperox, John Scalzi
Network Effect, Martha Wells
Fleet Elements, Walter Jon Williams
Interlibrary Loan, Gene Wolfe
Interior Chinatown, Charles Yu

Movies 
 Altered Carbon: Resleeved
 Invisible Man
 Last and First Men
 The Mitchells vs. the Machines
 Palm Springs
 Platform
 Possessor
 Sputnik
 Tenet

TV Series 

 Appare-Ranman!
Avenue 5
Brave New World
 Deca-Dence
Devs
 Ghost in the Shell SAC_2045
 ID:Invaded
The Midnight Gospel
Snowpiercer
 Solar Opposites
Space Force
Star Trek: Lower Decks
Star Trek: Picard
 Tales from the Loop
Y: The Last Man

Video games 

 Astro's Playroom
Cyberpunk 2077
DOOM Eternal
Half-Life: Alyx
The Last of Us Part II
 Wasteland 3

References

See also 

Science fiction by year
2020 in the arts
2020-related lists